Birgit Heinecke ( Richter, born 10 April 1957) is a former East German handball player who competed in the 1980 Summer Olympics.

In 1980 she won the bronze medal with the East German team. She played one match and scored three goals.

External links
 profile

1957 births
Living people
German female handball players
Handball players at the 1980 Summer Olympics
Olympic handball players of East Germany
Olympic bronze medalists for East Germany
Olympic medalists in handball
Medalists at the 1980 Summer Olympics